Sheila Lawlor, Baroness Lawlor is the founder and director of research at Politeia, a British political think tank.

She was previously a research fellow at Sidney Sussex College and Churchill College, University of Cambridge.

It was announced on 14th October 2022, as part of Boris Johnson's 2022 Special Honours, Lawlor would be appointed a life peer. On 3 November 2022, she was created Baroness Lawlor, of Midsummer Common in the City of Cambridge and was introduced on 28 November 2022.

She is married to John Marenbon.

References

Living people
Year of birth missing (living people)
Life peers created by Charles III
Conservative Party (UK) life peers
Life peeresses created by Charles III
21st-century British politicians
21st-century British women politicians
Place of birth missing (living people)